Sick is a satirical-humor magazine published from 1960 to 1980, lasting 134 issues.

Overview
Sick was created in 1960 by comic-book writer-artist Joe Simon, who also edited the title until the late 1960s. His son Jim Simon edited the magazine for several issues in 1976 to 1977. The magazine was published by Crestwood Publications until issue #62 (1968), when it was taken over by Hewfred Publications. Charlton Comics took over publishing the magazine in 1976 with issue #109.

Sick's original mascot was a blank-faced little physician. He was later replaced by a mascot named Huckleberry Fink, whose design was similar to that of Mad 's Alfred E. Neuman, and whose motto, instead of Neuman's "What, me worry?", was "Why Try Harder?"

Its contributors included Mad regulars Angelo Torres and Jack Davis, as well as Howard Cruse, Arnold Drake, Ernie Schroeder, Washington correspondent Jim Atkins, and B.K. Taylor. Its art director from 1961 until his death in 1967 was the noted comic-book artist Bob Powell.

In his book American Comic Book Chronicles 1960–1964, comic book historian John Wells comments:

See also
Sick comedy

References

1960 comics debuts
1980 comics endings
Satirical magazines published in the United States
Comics magazines published in the United States
Monthly magazines published in the United States
Black comedy comics
Defunct magazines published in the United States
Magazines established in 1960
Magazines disestablished in 1980
Magazines published in New York City
Comedy franchises